Budong-Budong is an Austronesian language of Sulawesi, Indonesia, spoken in the village of Tongkou, Budong-Budong Subdistrict, Central Mamuju Regency. Together with Seko Padang, Seko Tengah and Panasuan, it belongs to the Seko branch of the South Sulawesi subgroup.

References

Languages of Sulawesi
South Sulawesi languages
Endangered Austronesian languages